Lady Mary Ilona Margaret Whitley (née Cambridge; 24 September 1924 – 13 December 1999) was a relative 
of the British royal family. The only child of the 2nd Marquess of Cambridge, she was a second cousin of Queen Elizabeth II.

Early life

Lady Mary was born at 19, Lowndes Square, Kensington, to the Earl and Countess of Eltham, later the Marquess and Marchioness of Cambridge.  Lady Mary's mother was born Dorothy Isabel Westenra Hastings, a granddaughter of the 14th Earl of Huntingdon. She was a great-great-great-granddaughter of George III, a great-granddaughter of the 1st Duke of Westminster and a niece of the Duchess of Beaufort. Her father was a nephew of the Earl of Athlone and of Queen Mary, the consort to George V, making her a second cousin to Queen Elizabeth II.

Lord and Lady Eltham lived on the edge of Hyde Park, London, near Lord Eltham's cousin and his wife, the Duke and Duchess of York. The young Lady Mary was educated at home under the supervision of her grandmother, nanny, and governess. Often she would be invited to play with her second cousins (they shared great-grandparents, Francis of Teck and his wife Princess Mary Adelaide of Cambridge), the Princesses Elizabeth and Margaret of York, who lived near her by Hyde Park (specifically at 145 Piccadilly). When they were in London she would also play with George and Gerald Lascelles, the children of the Princess Royal, who were her second cousins. On 29 November 1934, she was a bridesmaid at the marriage of the Duke of Kent to Princess Marina of Greece and Denmark.

Life during the war
When not in London and for the duration of the London Blitz, the Cambridges sent Lady Mary to stay with her maternal grandmother, Mary Caroline Campbell Tarratt (died 1955), widow of Captain the Hon. Osmond Westenra Hastings (1873–1933), at Hodcott House, their country house near West Ilsley in Berkshire.

Her parents remained in London, as her father was a director of Coutts & Company, a banking firm, in the city. When Mary was older, toward the end of the war, she became a volunteer nurse in the blitzed area of London.

Marriage and family

On 9 November 1951 at Kirtling, Newmarket, Lady Mary married Peter Whitley (22 October 1923 Singapore-25 January 2003) of Leighland House, Roadwater, Watchet, Somerset, a son of Sir Norman Henry Pownall Whitley KCB, MC.

After their marriage, the couple was given the Lord Cambridge's London townhouse in St. James's Square. Peter pursued a career with Distillers Company and became a managing director before his retirement in 1985. The couple had two children:

 Sarah Elizabeth Whitley (born 30 November 1954), who married Timothy Felton (born 8 March 1954) on 18 September 1982 and has two children: Emily Ilona Felton (born 21 July 1985) and Chloë Amelia Felton (born 17 June 1987), the latest descendants of the Marquesses of Cambridge.
 Charles Francis Peter Whitley (born 10 September 1961), who married Diana Hewitt (born 8 November 1953) on 25 May 1991. They have no children.

Personal information

Lady Mary regularly attended major royal occasions, but like her father, she did not carry out royal duties. Mary was a junior bridesmaid at the 1934 wedding of her father's first cousin, Prince George, Duke of Kent to Princess Marina of Greece and Denmark. On 20 November 1947, she was also a bridesmaid at the wedding of Princess Elizabeth to Philip Mountbatten. She participated in the coronations of both King George VI and Queen Elizabeth II and attended the Trooping the Colour every year between 1950 and 1999 (excluding 1955, when it was cancelled due to a rail strike).

She attended the following royal marriages: Princess Margaret to Antony Armstrong-Jones, created 1st Earl of Snowdon (1960); the Prince of Wales to Lady Diana Spencer (1981); Anne, Princess Royal, to Captain Mark Phillips (1973) and Princess Anne's subsequent marriage to Commander Timothy Laurence (1992); Prince Andrew, Duke of York, to Sarah Ferguson (1986).

References

Robert Lacey, Majesty

External links
 British Pathé, LADY MARY CAMBRIDGE video newsreel film

1924 births
1999 deaths
People from Kensington
Daughters of British marquesses
British people of German descent
British people of English descent
Mary